KZTR may refer to:

 KZTR-LP, a low-power radio station (103.5 FM) licensed to serve Yakima, Washington, United States
 KBXT, a radio station (101.9 FM) licensed to serve Wixon Valley, Texas, United States, which held the call sign KZTR from 1996 to 2007
 KUNX, a radio station (1400 AM) licensed to serve Santa Paula, California, United States, which held the call sign KZTR from 1989 to 1991
 KCAQ, a radio station (95.9 FM) licensed to serve Camarillo, California, which held the call sign KZTR or KZTR-FM until 1991